

Women's 200 m Individual Medley - Final

Women's 200 m Individual Medley - Heats

Women's 200 m Individual Medley - Heat 01

Women's 200 m Individual Medley - Heat 02

Women's 200 m Individual Medley - Heat 03

200 metres individual medley
2006 in women's swimming